John Mervyn Manningham-Buller, 2nd Viscount Dilhorne (28 February 1932 – 25 June 2022) was a British peer and barrister.

Background and education
Lord Dilhorne was the son of Reginald Manningham-Buller, 1st Viscount Dilhorne, and Lady Mary Lindsay, daughter of David Lindsay, 27th Earl of Crawford. His sister is Eliza Manningham-Buller, Baroness Manningham-Buller, the former head of MI5. He was educated at Eton and the Royal Military Academy, Sandhurst.

Dilhorne was 6 foot 9 inches tall.

Career
After service in the Coldstream Guards, Dilhorne was called to the bar from the Inner Temple in 1979. He was Managing Director of Stewart Smith (LP&M) Ltd from 1970 to 1974 and Chairman of the Value Added Tax Tribunal from 1988 to 1995, a member of Wiltshire County Council, 1967 to 1970, of the Joint Parliamentary Committee on Statutory Instruments, 1981 to 1988, of the JPC on Consolidation Bills, 1994–1999, and of the EC Select Committee (Law and Institutions), 1989–1992.

Marriage and children
Lord Dilhorne married, firstly, Gillian Stockwell, on 8 October 1955, and they were divorced in 1973. They had three children:

 James Edward Manningham-Buller, 3rd Viscount Dilhorne (born 20 August 1956)
 Hon Mervyn Reginald Manningham-Buller (born 11 July 1962)
 Hon Mary Louise Manningham-Buller (born 8 March 1970)

Dilhorne married, secondly, Susannah Jane Eykyn, on 17 December 1981. She is a professor of clinical microbiology associated with St Thomas' Hospital.

The Dilhornes had homes in London and at Minterne Parva, near Cerne Abbas, Dorset.

Dilhorne died on 25 June 2022, at the age of 90, and was succeeded in the viscountcy by his elder son, James.

References

External links

1932 births
2022 deaths
Coldstream Guards officers
People educated at Eton College
Members of Wiltshire County Council
Viscounts in the Peerage of the United Kingdom
Conservative Party (UK) hereditary peers
Graduates of the Royal Military Academy Sandhurst
John
English barristers
Dilhorne